Prapor Stadium is a football stadium located in Kramatorsk, Donetsk Oblast. Built in 1936, in 2011-2017 it was known as Avanhard Stadium. The seating capacity of the stadium is 6,000 seats.

The stadium is kept on the balance of the Old Kramatorsk Machinebuilding Factory (SKMZ).

According to some sources Kramatorsk has two stadiums and both of them carried the name of Avanhard. One is the old Prapor Stadium which is the city's central venue and located in the garden Bernatsky, the other is a Sports Complex Blyuminh (Blooming) which is owned by the New Kramatorsk Machinebuilding Factory (NKMZ) and located in the Pushkin's Park.

References

External links
 Information at the FC Avanhard Kramatorsk website
 Brief documentary footage "Kramatorsk 1938. Stadium" (Краматорськ 1938. Стадіон). "Telekon" studio, 2009. "YouTube", 5 November 2015.

Sports venues completed in 1936
Sports venues built in the Soviet Union
Football venues in Donetsk Oblast
Buildings and structures in Kramatorsk
Sport in Kramatorsk
Football venues in the Soviet Union
FC Kramatorsk
Avanhard (sports society)
Sports venues in Donetsk Oblast